This article list the results of women's singles category in the 2009 All England Super Series.

Seeds
 Tine Rasmussen
 Zhou Mi
 Lu Lan
 Pi Hongyan
 Xie Xingfang
 Zhu Lin
 Wang Lin
 Xu Huaiwen

Draws

Finals

Top Half

Bottom Half

Sources
Yonex All England Open Super Series 2009 - Women's singles

- Women's Singles, 2009 All England Super Series